North Somerset is a unitary authority area in England. Its area covers part of the ceremonial county of Somerset but it is administered independently of the non-metropolitan county. Its administrative headquarters is in the town hall in Weston-super-Mare. North Somerset borders the local government areas of Bristol, Bath and North East Somerset, Mendip and Sedgemoor. North Somerset contains the parliamentary constituencies of Weston-super-Mare and North Somerset.

A scheduled monument is a nationally important archaeological site or monument which is given legal protection by being placed on a list (or "schedule") by the Secretary of State for Culture, Media and Sport; English Heritage takes the leading role in identifying such sites. The legislation governing this is the Ancient Monuments and Archaeological Areas Act 1979. The term "monument" can apply to the whole range of archaeological sites, and they are not always visible above ground. Such sites have to have been deliberately constructed by human activity. They range from prehistoric standing stones and burial sites, through Roman remains and medieval structures such as castles and monasteries, to later structures such as industrial sites and buildings constructed for the World Wars or the Cold War.

There are 68 scheduled monuments in North Somerset. The oldest site Aveline's Hole, a cave in which bones from the Mesolithic have been identified making it the earliest scientifically dated cemetery in Britain. There are also multiple Neolithic tumuli. There are also several Iron Age hillforts, such as the one at Worlebury Camp. Dolebury Warren, another Iron Age hillfort, was reused as a medieval rabbit warren. The Romano-British period is represented with sites including villas. Sites from the Middle Ages include motte-and-bailey castles, such as Locking Castle, and church crosses. There are also several deserted medieval settlements. Woodspring Priory is a former Augustinian priory founded in the early 13th century. More recent sites date from the Industrial Revolution and include the Elms colliery and glassworks in Nailsea. The most recent monuments are two Palmerstonian gun batteries, built in the 1860s, on the island of Steep Holm. The monuments are listed below using the titles given in the English Heritage data sheets.

Monuments

|}

See also
 Scheduled Monuments in Somerset
 Grade I listed buildings in North Somerset
 Grade II* listed buildings in North Somerset

Notes

References

List
Archaeological sites in Somerset
History of Somerset
Somerset, North
Lists of buildings and structures in Somerset